Mordella sydneyana is a species of beetle in the genus Mordella of the family Mordellidae, which is part of the superfamily Tenebrionoidea. It was described in 1893.

References

Beetles described in 1893
sydneyana
Taxa named by Thomas Blackburn (entomologist)